Kenneth Allan Grundt (born August 26, 1969 in Melrose Park, Illinois) is a former middle-relief pitcher who played in Major League Baseball. Listed at 6'4", 195 lb., he threw left-handed.

Grundt went to Luther North High School (Chicago, IL). He played NCAA Division 2 College Baseball with Missouri Southern State University, and got drafted by the San Francisco Giants in the 53rd round of the 1991 MLB June Amateur Draft (1,354th).

He played from 1992 through 1998 for the San Francisco Giants, Colorado Rockies, Boston Red Sox, and Florida Marlins organizations, collecting a 31-19 mark with a 2.58 ERA and 35 saves in 288 appearances.

Grundt entered the majors in 1996 with the Boston Red Sox (first game on August 8, 1996 at Age 26), playing for them until the 1997 midseason. He posted a 10.80 ERA in three games and did not have a decision. His last MLB game was on May 20, 1997.

Following his playing career, Grundt has worked as senior instructor at Frozen Ropes, a baseball instructional center located at Dickson City, Pennsylvania.

Grundt is married to his Wife, Amy, and they have a Son, Adam. They currently reside in Pennsylvania.

Currently, Grundt coaches a baseball travel team called the East Coast Sandhogs. He coaches the 16U boys travel team, which his son Adam is on, as well.

References

The Times Tribune

Boston Red Sox players
Major League Baseball pitchers
Missouri Southern Lions baseball players
1969 births
Living people
Asheville Tourists players
Charlotte Knights players
Clinton Giants players
Colorado Springs Sky Sox players
Everett Giants players
New Haven Ravens players
Pawtucket Red Sox players
San Jose Giants players
Sioux Falls Canaries players
Trenton Thunder players
Baseball players from Chicago
Arizona League Giants players